John McEnroe and Peter Rennert were the defending champions but lost in the final 6–2, 6–4 to Mark Edmondson and Sherwood Stewart

Seeds

  Kevin Curren /  Steve Denton (first round)
  John McEnroe /  Peter Rennert (final)
  Mark Edmondson /  Sherwood Stewart (champions)
  Fritz Buehning /  Ferdi Taygan (semifinals)

Draw

External links
1983 Custom Credit Australian Indoor Championships Doubles Draw

Doubles